Melese ocellata is a moth of the family Erebidae. It was described by George Hampson in 1901. It is found in French Guiana, Brazil and Mexico.

References

 

Melese
Moths described in 1901